Mszczonów  (Yiddish: אַמשינאָוו Amshinov) is a town in Żyrardów County, Masovian Voivodeship, Poland, with 6,231 inhabitants as of the 2006 census. It is situated just outside the Warsaw metropolitan area, approximately 45 km from Warsaw city centre.

History

The oldest known mention of Mszczonów comes from a document of Duke Konrad I of Masovia from 1245, when it was part of fragmented Piast-ruled Poland. Mszczonów was granted town rights in 1377 or earlier. It was a royal town of Poland, administratively located in the Rawa Voivodeship in the Greater Poland Province. One of two main routes connecting Warsaw and Dresden ran through the town in the 18th century and Kings Augustus II the Strong and Augustus III of Poland often traveled that route.

The town possessed a vibrant Jewish community, and it was once the center of the Hasidic Amshinov dynasty (Mszczonów being pronounced as "Amshinov" in Yiddish.)

During the invasion of Poland, which started World War II in September 1939, the town was invaded by Nazi Germany. On September 8, 1939, German troops murdered 11 Polish prisoners of war in the town, and on September 11, 1939, the Germans carried out a mass execution of 20 local Poles, including mayor Aleksander Tański, two priests and a doctor (see Nazi crimes against the Polish nation). At least five Poles from Mszczonów were murdered by the Russians in the large Katyn massacre in 1940.

Sports and recreation
Deepspot, the second deepest swimming pool in the world, is located in the town.

The local football team is KS Mszczonowianka. It competes in the lower leagues.

Notable people
 Jan Adam Maklakiewicz (1899–1954), Polish composer and conductor, whose former home houses a museum
 Mieczysław Zdzienicki (1892–1953), Polish social activist, lawyer and bibliophile

References

External links
 Jewish Community in Mszczonów on Virtual Shtetl

Cities and towns in Masovian Voivodeship
Żyrardów County
Historic Jewish communities in Poland
Nazi war crimes in Poland
World War II prisoner of war massacres by Nazi Germany
Shtetls